Tamara Rademakers (born 20 April 1982) is a Dutch professional pool player currently residing at Hoensbroek, Netherlands. Rademakers reached the semi-finals of the Women's World Pool Billiard Association Masters event in 2017. Rademakers twice reached the knockout rounds at the Women's WPA World Nine-ball Championship in both 2009 and 2010, losing in the last 32.

Rademakers is a twice semi-finalist of events on the Euro Tour, reaching the semi-final at the 2013 Portugal Open, and the 2018 Leende Open. Rademakers is also a two-time European Pool Championship runner up. Rademakers reached the final of the 8-Ball event in 2018, and the 10-Ball in 2019.

References

External links

Female pool players
Dutch pool players
1982 births
Living people